Kent and Hitchens Housese were a matched pair of historic homes located at Williamsport, Warren County, Indiana.  They were built in 1854, and are two-story, Italian Villa style brick dwellings.  Each features a three-story corner tower set at an angle to the main part of the building. The houses were originally mirror images of each other.  The house at 500 Main was destroyed by a fire in the 1990s.

It was listed on the National Register of Historic Places in 1984.

References

Houses on the National Register of Historic Places in Indiana
Italianate architecture in Indiana
Houses completed in 1854
Buildings and structures in Warren County, Indiana
National Register of Historic Places in Warren County, Indiana